Rambach may refer to

 The Rom River in its South Tyrol stretches
 Rambach im Innkreis, another name for Rainbach im Innkreis
 Adalbert Rambach, a German author
 Amy Lynn Rambach Peikoff, a writer, blogger, and professor of philosophy and law
 Augustus Jacob Rambach, a German author
 Johann Jacob Rambach (18th c.), a German author
 Jörg Rambach, one of the alleged discoverers of the Kafkania pebble
 Karl Rambach
 Lynn Rambach Pressman Raymond
 Pierre Rambach, a French architect